Chalo Jeete Hain is a  2018 Indian short film directed and produced by Mangesh Hadawale. The short film is said to be based on the early life of prime minister of India, Narendra Modi.

References

External links

Indian short films
2018 short films
Indian biographical films
2010s Hindi-language films